Jim Miller was the athletic director at the University of Richmond from 2000 until 2012.  Prior to moving to Richmond, Miller was the executive associate director of athletics at North Carolina State University.  Miller joined the NC State athletic program in 1990 as compliance officer and overseeing public relations and marketing.  In 1999, a restructuring within the NC State athletic department resulted in athletic director Les Robinson taking responsibility for fundraising and promotion, while Miller became responsible for overseeing the day-to-day activities of the athletic department.

In college, Miller played basketball and baseball at Old Dominion University.  He holds a master's degree in education from Old Dominion and a law degree from the College of William & Mary.

External links
 "The Jim-nasium": Jim Miller's blog

Year of birth missing (living people)
Living people
Richmond Spiders athletic directors
Old Dominion Monarchs baseball players
Old Dominion Monarchs men's basketball players
William & Mary Law School alumni